Michina (Quechua for pasture) is a  mountain in the Cordillera Occidental in the Bolivian Andes. It is located in the Potosí Department, Sur Lípez Province, San Pablo de Lípez Municipality, at the border with Chile. Michina lies within the borders of the Eduardo Avaroa Andean Fauna National Reserve. It is situated south of Tocorpuri.

References 

Mountains of Potosí Department